The Geobacterales are an order within the Thermodesulfobacteriota.

References

Thermodesulfobacteriota
Bacteria orders